Castilleja foliolosa is a species of Indian paintbrush, known by the common names woolly Indian paintbrush and Texas Indian paintbrush.

It is native to California and northern Baja California, where it grows in chaparral and rocky desert and mountain slopes. Despite its common name, it does not occur in Texas.

Description
Castilleja foliolosa is a perennial wildflower that grows up to 60 centimeters tall and is coated in woolly white or gray branching hairs. The leaves are linear in shape and up to 5 centimeters long.

The inflorescence is made up of layers of bracts tipped in bright orange-red to dull yellowish green. Between the colorful bracts appear the nondescript flowers, which are greenish in color and pouch-shaped. The fruit is a capsule just over a centimeter long.

External links
Jepson Manual Treatment: Castilleja foliolosa
Castilleja foliolosa Photo gallery

foliolosa
Flora of California
Flora of Baja California
Flora of the California desert regions
Flora of the Sierra Nevada (United States)
Natural history of the California chaparral and woodlands
Natural history of the California Coast Ranges
Natural history of the Channel Islands of California
Natural history of the Mojave Desert
Natural history of the San Francisco Bay Area
Plants described in 1833
Flora without expected TNC conservation status